The following is a set–index article, providing a list of lists, for the cities, towns and villages within the jurisdictional United States. It is divided, alphabetically, according to the state, territory, or district name in which they are located.

A

Alabama

 Census-designated places in Alabama
Cities and towns in Alabama

Alaska

 Census-designated places in Alaska
 Cities in Alaska

American Samoa

 Administrative divisions of American Samoa

Arizona

 Census-designated places in Arizona
 Cities and towns in Arizona
 Places in Arizona

Arkansas

 Census-designated places in Arkansas
 Cities and towns in Arkansas

C

California

 Census-designated places in California
 Cities and towns in California
 Communities in California
 Places in California

Colorado

List of populated places in Colorado
List of census-designated places in Colorado
List of county seats in Colorado
List of forts in Colorado
List of ghost towns in Colorado
List of historic places in Colorado
List of municipalities in Colorado
List of post offices in Colorado

Connecticut

 Census-designated places in Connecticut
 Boroughs in Connecticut
 Cities in Connecticut
 Towns in Connecticut

D

Delaware

 Census-designated places in Delaware
 Incorporated places in Delaware
 Places in Delaware

District of Columbia

 Neighborhoods of the District of Columbia

F

Florida

 Census-designated places in Florida
 Municipalities in Florida
 Places in Florida

G

Georgia

 Census-designated places in Georgia
 Municipalities in Georgia
 Places in Georgia

Guam

 Villages of Guam

H

Hawaii

 Places in Hawaii

I

Idaho

 Census-designated places in Idaho
 Cities in Idaho
 Places in Idaho

Illinois

 Census-designated places in Illinois
 Municipalities in Illinois
 Towns and villages in Illinois

Indiana

 Census-designated places in Indiana
 Cities in Indiana
 Towns in Indiana

Iowa

 Census-designated places in Iowa
 Cities in Iowa

K

Kansas

 Census-designated places in Kansas
 Cities in Kansas

Kentucky

 Cities in Kentucky

L

Louisiana

 Census-designated places in Louisiana
 Municipalities in Louisiana
 Unincorporated communities in Louisiana

M

Maine

 Census-designated places in Maine
 Cities in Maine
 Plantations in Maine
 Towns in Maine

Maryland

 Census-designated places in Maryland
 Municipalities in Maryland

Massachusetts

 Census-designated places in Massachusetts
 Municipalities in Massachusetts

Michigan

 Census-designated places in Michigan
 Cities, villages, and townships in Michigan

Minnesota

 Census-designated places in Minnesota
 Cities in Minnesota

Mississippi

 Census-designated places in Mississippi
 Municipalities in Mississippi

Missouri

 Census-designated places in Missouri
 Cities in Missouri
 Municipalities in Missouri
 Villages in Missouri

Montana

 Census-designated places in Montana
 Cities and towns in Montana
 Places in Montana

N

Nebraska

 Cities in Nebraska
 Unincorporated communities in Nebraska
 Villages in Nebraska

Nevada

 Census-designated places in Nevada
 Cities in Nevada

New Hampshire

 Census-designated places in New Hampshire
 Cities and towns in New Hampshire

New Jersey

 Census-designated places in New Jersey
 Municipalities in New Jersey

New Mexico

 Census-designated places in New Mexico
 Municipalities in New Mexico

New York

 Census-designated places in New York
 Cities in New York
 Places in New York
 Towns in New York
 Villages in New York

North Carolina

 Census-designated places in North Carolina
 Municipalities in North Carolina
 Unincorporated communities in North Carolina

North Dakota

 Census-designated places in North Dakota
 Cities in North Dakota

Northern Mariana Islands

 Populated places in the Northern Mariana Islands

O

Ohio

 Census-designated places in Ohio
 Cities in Ohio
 Villages in Ohio

Oklahoma

 Census-designated places in Oklahoma
 List of municipalities in Oklahoma

Oregon

 Cities and unincorporated communities in Oregon

P

Pennsylvania

 Census-designated places in Pennsylvania
 Cities in Pennsylvania
 Towns and boroughs in Pennsylvania
 Townships in Pennsylvania

Puerto Rico

 Municipalities of Puerto Rico
 List of communities in Puerto Rico

R

Rhode Island

 Census-designated places in Rhode Island
 Municipalities in Rhode Island

S

South Carolina

 Census-designated places in South Carolina
 Cities and towns in South Carolina

South Dakota

 Census-designated places in South Dakota
 Cities in South Dakota
 Towns in South Dakota

T

Tennessee

 Census-designated places in Tennessee
 Municipalities in Tennessee

Texas

 Census-designated places in Texas
 Cities in Texas
 Towns in Texas
 Unincorporated communities in Texas

U

Utah

 Census-designated places in Utah
 Municipalities in Utah

V

Vermont

 Census-designated places in Vermont
 Cities in Vermont
 Towns in Vermont
 Villages in Vermont

Virgin Islands (U.S.)

Districts and sub-districts of the United States Virgin Islands
Settlements of the United States Virgin Islands

Virginia

 Census-designated places in Virginia
 Cities in Virginia
 Towns in Virginia

W

Washington

 Census-designated places in Washington
 Cities in Washington
 Towns in Washington

West Virginia

 Census-designated places in West Virginia
 Cities in West Virginia
 Towns in West Virginia

Wisconsin

 Census-designated places in Wisconsin
 Cities in Wisconsin
 Towns in Wisconsin
 Villages in Wisconsin

Wyoming

 Census-designated places in Wyoming
 Municipalities in Wyoming

See also

United States
Outline of the United States
Index of United States-related articles
United States Census Bureau
Demographics of the United States
Urbanization in the United States
List of US states and territories by population
List of United States cities by population
Lists of US cities and metropolitan areas
United States Office of Management and Budget
Statistical area (United States)
Combined statistical area (list)
Core-based statistical area (list)
Metropolitan statistical area (list)
Micropolitan statistical area (list)
Local government in the United States
List of American cities by year of foundation
List of populated places in the United States with Hispanic plurality populations
List of the most common U.S. place names
Ranally city rating system

External links
The National League of Cities
USA by Map: US places with population by map

 

 
.Populated

es:Ciudades de Estados Unidos
fr:Villes aux États-Unis
pt:Anexo:Lista de cidades dos Estados Unidos